Elections to Castlereagh Borough Council were held on 15 May 1985 on the same day as the other Northern Irish local government elections. The election used three district electoral areas to elect a total of 21 councillors.

Election results

Note: "Votes" are the first preference votes.

Districts summary

|- class="unsortable" align="centre"
!rowspan=2 align="left"|Ward
! % 
!Cllrs
! % 
!Cllrs
! %
!Cllrs
! % 
!Cllrs
!rowspan=2|TotalCllrs
|- class="unsortable" align="center"
!colspan=2 bgcolor="" | DUP
!colspan=2 bgcolor="" | UUP
!colspan=2 bgcolor="" | Alliance
!colspan=2 bgcolor="white"| Others
|-
|align="left"|Castlereagh Central
|bgcolor="#D46A4C"|58.2
|bgcolor="#D46A4C"|4
|19.6
|2
|20.5
|1
|1.7
|0
|7
|-
|align="left"|Castlereagh East
|bgcolor="#D46A4C"|46.2
|bgcolor="#D46A4C"|3
|31.9
|3
|18.1
|1
|3.8
|0
|7
|-
|align="left"|Castlereagh South
|bgcolor="#D46A4C"|40.1
|bgcolor="#D46A4C"|3
|35.5
|3
|17.7
|1
|6.7
|0
|7
|- class="unsortable" class="sortbottom" style="background:#C9C9C9"
|align="left"| Total
|48.0
|10
|29.0
|8
|18.8
|3
|4.2
|0
|21
|-
|}

District results

Castlereagh Central

1985: 4 x DUP, 2 x UUP, 1 x Alliance

Castlereagh East

1985: 3 x DUP, 3 x UUP, 1 x Alliance

Castlereagh South

1985: 3 x DUP, 3 x UUP, 1 x Alliance

References

Castlereagh Borough Council elections
Castlereagh